The Surf eel (Ichthyapus ophioneus, also known as the Finless snake eel in the United States<ref>[http://www.fishbase.ca/comnames/CommonNamesList.php?ID=2647&GenusName=Ichthyapus&SpeciesName=ophioneus&StockCode=2843 Common names of 'Ichthyapus ophioneus] at www.fishbase.org.</ref>) is an eel in the family Ophichthidae (worm/snake eels). It was described by Barton Warren Evermann and Millard Caleb Marsh in 1900, originally under the genus Sphagebranchus''. It is a marine, tropical eel which is known from the western and eastern Atlantic Ocean, including Bermuda, the Bahamas, Florida, USA; Puerto Rico, the Virgin Islands, northern South America, and St. Helena Island.

References

Ophichthidae
Taxa named by Barton Warren Evermann
Taxa named by Millard Caleb Marsh
Fish described in 1900